Rhinophoridae is a family of flies (Diptera), commonly known as Woodlouse Flies, found in all zoogeographic regions except Oceania, but mainly in the Palaearctic and Afrotropical regions.

They are small, slender, black, bristly flies phylogenetically close to the Tachinidae, although some authors consider them a sister group of the Calliphoridae. The larvae are mostly parasitoids of woodlice, beetles, spiders, and other arthropods, and occasionally snails.

By 2020, about 33 genera were placed in the family, with a total 177 species.

Genera include:
Acompomintho Villeneuve, 1927
Apomorphyto Cerretti, Lo Giudice & Pape, 2014
Aporeomyia Pape & Shima, 1993
Axinia Colless, 1994
Azaisia Villeneuve, 1939
Baniassa Kugler, 1978
Bezzimyia Townsend, 1919
Bixinia Cerretti, Lo Giudice & Pape, 2014
Comoromyia Crosskey, 1977
Kinabalumyia Cerretti & Pape, 2020
Macrotarsina Schiner, 1857
Malayia Malloch, 1926
Marshallicona Cerretti & Pape, 2020
Maurhinophora Cerretti & Pape, 2020
Melanomyoides Crosskey, 1977
Melanophora Meigen, 1803
Metoplisa Kugler, 1978
Neotarsina Cerretti & Pape, 2020
Oplisa Rondani, 1862
Parazamimus Verbeke, 1962
Paykullia Robineau-Desvoidy, 1830
Phyto Robineau-Desvoidy, 1830
Queximyia Crosskey, 1977
Rhinodonia Cerretti, Lo Giudice & Pape, 2014
Rhinomorinia Brauer & von Bergenstamm, 1889
Rhinopeza Cerretti, Lo Giudice & Pape, 2014
Rhinophora Robineau-Desvoidy, 1830
Shannoniella Townsend, 1939
Stevenia Robineau-Desvoidy, 1830
Tricogena Rondani, 1856
Tromodesia Rondani, 1856
Trypetidomima Townsend, 1919
Ventrops Crosskey, 1977

References

Further reading 

 
 
 
 

 
Brachycera families
Articles containing video clips